Aularches miliaris is a grasshopper species of the monotypic genus Aularches, belonging to the family Pyrgomorphidae. The bright warning colours keep away predators and their defense when disturbed includes the ejection of a toxic foam.  

The insect has been called by a variety of names including coffee locust, ghost grasshopper, northern spotted grasshopper, and foam grasshopper, and enjoys some popularity as a pet insect.

Description

The head and thorax are dark green with a canary-yellow band on the side.  The tegmina are green with many yellow spots; the legs are blue, with a yellow serrated pattern on the hind femora.  The abdomen is black with bright red bands.

Subspecies and distribution
There are two subspecies:
 A. miliaris miliaris (Linnaeus, 1758) - India to Indo-China
 A. miliaris pseudopunctatus Kevan, 1974 - Pakistan

Habits
It swarms in October, the mating and egg-laying season, collecting on bushes and grasses.  It is heavy and sluggish, able to make only short leaps, very visible on vegetation. Outbreaks leading to this species damaging cultivated crops are uncommon.

When A. miliaris (of either sex) is disturbed or grabbed, it emits a sharp rasping noise from its thoracic segments. If its thorax is pinched, it also squirts a clear viscous mucus with unpleasant smell and a bitter taste, faintly alkaline, with many embedded bubbles. This foam comes out as a strong jet from apertures in the thorax, and more gently from other openings in the body (ten in total); it heaps up around the insect and partly covers it.

Conservation
Autarchies miliaris, like most other grasshoppers, are considered a pest in agricultural areas; however it is also endangered or near threatened in South India. A. miliaris lays eggs in the soil which aerates the soil promoting biodiversity and creates ecosystem value. Their interactions and natural process contribute to the health of the soil. The presence of a variety of insects in the soil are indicators of soil quality. There are a few conservation efforts for this species. At times of high population, growth can be controlled by tilling the area where they deposit their egg pods or collecting the grasshoppers; pesticides are effective; however they are normally not environmentally friendly and can cause damage to other animals and vegetation.  Lack of awareness among the residents regarding the entomofauna diversity has led to the misidentification of Autarchies miliaris  as the plague causing locust species at many instances and evoked panic among local farmers.

References

External links 
 
 Orthoptera Species File

Pyrgomorphidae
Aposematic animals
Grasshoppers described in 1758
Orthoptera of Asia
Taxa named by Carl Linnaeus
Monotypic Orthoptera genera